The Casimir Pulaski Foundation (Fundacja im. Kazimierza Pułaskiego, FKP) is an independent, non-profit, and non-partisan think tank based in Warsaw, Poland specializing in foreign policy and security research. The foundation is named after Casimir Pulaski.

History
Founded in 2004, the foundation concentrates in its research in two areas: transatlantic relations in the context of security policy and research in the post-Soviet sphere of influence. Foundation has been founded by Zbigniew Pisarski.

Other points of interests include Asia, Africa, the Middle East, and Europe. In 2017 Pulaski Foundation was recognized by the UK Prospect (magazine) with a Think Tank Award 2017 for the Best EU International Affairs Think Tank. In 2018, 2019 and 2020, the Casimir Pulaski Foundation was also recognized as the first among Polish Think Tanks dealing with defence and national security according to the "Global Go To Think Tank Index" reports.

Programs and activities
The Pulaski Foundation provides strategic analysis and solutions for government policy makers, the private sector and civil society. The Foundation also hosts the Warsaw Security Forum, an annual meeting held every autumn for leaders and experts in international security. The Pulaski foundation is one of only two Polish non-governmental organizations which is a partner organization to the Council of Europe. The Foundation is also a member of the Zagranica Group, an association of Polish non-governmental organizations that work abroad in cooperation with foreign partners to mutual benefit.

Publications
The Foundation publishes the Pulaski Policy Papers, Pulaski Report and Pulaski Viewpoint, which analyze crucial issues for Poland in matters of foreign and domestic policy and economy. The experts of the Foundation cooperate with media on a regular basis commenting on matters connected with international politics.  It is also the publisher of the Communication Platform for Non-Governmental Organizations, a web initiative is organized under the auspices of the Council of Europe.

The Knight of Freedom Award 
Each year, the Casimir Pulaski Foundation awards the Knight of Freedom Award to an individual who has promoted the values represented by Casimir Pulaski.

References

Further reading
 Pospieszna, Paulina. Democracy Assistance from the Third Wave: Polish Engagement in Belarus and Ukraine, University of Pittsburgh Press, 2014

External links
 The Casimir Pulaski Foundation

Organisations based in Warsaw
Casimir Pulaski